Robert Llewellyn (born 1956) is a British actor, comedian and writer.

Robert Llewellyn may also refer to:

 Robert Llewelyn (priest) (1909–2008), Church of England priest 
 Robert Llewellyn (photographer) (born 1945), American photographer
 Robert Baxter Llewelyn (1845–1919), colonial administrator in the British Empire